Eastham or East Ham, may refer to:

People
Ashley Eastham (born 1991), English footballer
George R. Eastham (1914–2000), English footballer
George E. Eastham (born 1936), English footballer and son of the George R. Eastham
Harry Eastham (1917–1998), English footballer and brother of George R. Eastham

Places
 Eastham, Massachusetts, town in Massachusetts, USA
 North Eastham, Massachusetts, village in Eastham, Massachusetts
 Eastham, Merseyside, village on the Wirral Peninsula, England
 Eastham, Worcestershire, village in Worcestershire,  England
 Eastham Unit, a prison in Lovelady, Texas
 East Ham, a district of London, England
 East Ham (UK Parliament constituency)

See also

 
 
 
 East (disambiguation)
 Ham (disambiguation)